Santa Joana is a civil parish in Aveiro Municipality, Aveiro District, Portugal. The population in 2011 was 8,094, in an area of 5.85 km2.

References

Freguesias of Aveiro, Portugal